Margaret Ekpo International Airport , also known as Calabar Airport, is an airport serving Calabar, the capital of the Cross River State in Nigeria. The airport is named after Margaret Ekpo, who was one of Nigeria's pioneering feminist and anticolonial activists.  It was commissioned in 1983 by Alhaji Shehu Shagari, then president of Nigeria.

Airlines and destinations

Statistics 
These data show number of passengers movements into the airport, according to the Federal Airports Authority of Nigeria's Aviation Sector Summary Reports.

See also
Transport in Nigeria
List of airports in Nigeria
List of the busiest airports in Africa

References

External links

SkyVector - Margaret Ekpo

Airports in Nigeria
Cross River State